Muhammad Asad (born 8 August 1998) is a Pakistani cricketer. He made his first-class debut for Karachi Whites in the 2016–17 Quaid-e-Azam Trophy on 29 October 2016. Prior to his first-class debut, he was named in Pakistan's squad for the 2016 Under-19 Cricket World Cup.

References

External links
 

1998 births
Living people
Pakistani cricketers
Karachi Whites cricketers